Frederick Creek may refer to:

Frederick Creek (Minnesota), a stream in Minnesota
Frederick Creek (Missouri), a stream in Missouri